Dimitar Stoyanov (born 17 June 1931) is a Bulgarian former wrestler. He competed at the 1956 Summer Olympics and the 1960 Summer Olympics.

References

External links
 

1931 births
Possibly living people
Bulgarian male sport wrestlers
Olympic wrestlers of Bulgaria
Wrestlers at the 1956 Summer Olympics
Wrestlers at the 1960 Summer Olympics
People from Haskovo
Sportspeople from Haskovo Province